James S. Gwin (born August 10, 1954) is a Senior United States district judge of the United States District Court for the Northern District of Ohio.

Education and career

Born in Canton, Ohio in 1954, Gwin graduated from St. Thomas Aquinas High School in Louisville, Ohio, and received an Artium Baccalaureus degree from Kenyon College in 1976 and a Juris Doctor from the University of Akron School of Law in 1979. He was in private practice in Canton from 1979 to 1989. He was a judge on the Stark County Common Pleas Court from 1989 to 1997.

Federal judicial service

Gwin was nominated by President Bill Clinton on July 31, 1997, to a seat on the United States District Court for the Northern District of Ohio vacated by Sam H. Bell. He was confirmed by the United States Senate on November 5, 1997, and received his commission on November 7, 1997. He assumed senior status on January 31, 2021.

References

Sources

1954 births
Living people
Ohio state court judges
Judges of the United States District Court for the Northern District of Ohio
United States district court judges appointed by Bill Clinton
Kenyon College alumni
University of Akron alumni
Lawyers from Canton, Ohio
20th-century American judges
21st-century American judges